Coşkun Büktel (18 December 1950 – 6 November 2018) was a Turkish playwright, screenwriter, novelist, theatre critic and translator.

He was born in İzmir, Turkey, in 1950 and graduated from the English Philology department of Istanbul University in 1981. He is best known for his twice-published play Theope, and also as a highly creative theatre critic.

Büktel also published a drama anthology named Eleştiren Oyunlar (The Criticizing Plays) and also translated D. H. Lawrence’s novella The Fox into Turkish. In his later years he wrote three screenplays, including Fiasco, the rights to which famous Turkish director/producer Sinan Çetin purchased, and İkinci Geliş (The Second Coming), which was turned into a novel and is to be published soon.

From 2007 onwards, Coşkun Büktel worked on (uncreditedly) as a script doctor for one of the best rated TV serials Arka Sıradakiler, which reached its third season, and 88th episode, in October 2009.

Published works
 Theope (1993, 2007)
 Shakespeare'siz Herifler (Guys with no Shakespeare) (1998)
 Türk Tiyatrosundan İnsan Manzaraları (Human Landscapes From Turkish Theater) (1998)
 Eleştiren Oyunlar (The Criticizing Plays) (1998)
 Tilki (The Fox) (1998)
 Yönetmen Tiyatrosuna Karşı (Against The Theater of Directors) (2001)
 Fiyasko (Fiasco) (2005). A funny crime novel, translated into English as Fiasco (Çitlembik Publication, 2008) by Feyza Howell.

References

External links
 Coşkun Büktel website

1950 births
2018 deaths
Translators from English
Translators to Turkish
Turkish dramatists and playwrights
Turkish male screenwriters
Turkish theatre critics
Turkish translators
20th-century translators